Creature Feature may refer to:

 A monster movie
 Creature Feature (Chill), a 1985 supplement for the horror fantasy role-playing game Chill
 Creature Feature (comic strip), a cartoon strip which appeared weekly in the Sunday Times supplement Funday Times
 Creature Feature (EP), an EP by Man or Astro-man?
 Creature Feature (1973 TV series), a TV horror film show broadcast on WTOG, 1973–1995
 Creature Features (1969 TV series), a classic horror film show broadcast on WNEW, 1969–1973
 "Creature Feature", a song by Chapman Whitney from the album Chapman Whitney Streetwalkers

See also
 Creature Features, a generic title for a genre of horror TV format shows broadcast on local U.S. television stations